George Frederick Martin (9 June 1876 – 28 November 1946) was an Australian politician.

He was born in Hayes Siding in Tasmania. In 1912 he was elected to the Tasmanian House of Assembly as a Labor member for Franklin. He was defeated in 1916. Martin died in Launceston in 1946.

References

1876 births
1946 deaths
Members of the Tasmanian House of Assembly
Australian Labor Party members of the Parliament of Tasmania